"Scatman (Ski-Ba-Bop-Ba-Dop-Bop)" is a song by American musician Scatman John. It was released in November 1994 as a single, and was later re-released in July 1995 for his second album, Scatman's World (1995). The song is described as "a blend of jazz scatting, rap, and house beats". It reached number-one on the charts in at least nine countries and also won the March 1996 Echo Award in Germany for the best Rock/Pop single.

Background and release

Born in El Monte, California, Larkin suffered from a severe stutter by the time he learned to speak which led to an emotionally traumatic childhood. At age twelve, he began to learn piano and was introduced to the art of scat singing two years later, through records by Ella Fitzgerald and Louis Armstrong, among others. Larkin became a professional jazz pianist in the 1970s and 1980s, playing many engagements in jazz clubs around Los Angeles. His first known performance on a studio album was in 1981 on the album Animal Sounds by Sam Phipps. In 1986, he released the self titled album John Larkin on the Transition label. This album was produced by John himself, along with Marcia Larkin.

To advance his career in 1990, Larkin moved to Berlin, Germany. From there, he discovered the appreciative jazz culture and started playing jazz gigs. This was when he first decided to take a monumental step away from his insecurities and add singing to his act for the first time. His agent Manfred Zähringer from Iceberg Records (Denmark) thought of combining scat singing with modern dance music and hip hop effects. Larkin was resistant at first, terrified of being laughed at and criticized once again, but BMG Hamburg was open. Larkin was worried that listeners would realise he stuttered, and his wife, Judy, suggested that he talk about it directly in his music.

Producer Tony Catania then received a VHS from Zähringer. On the tape, he observed Larkin playing piano songs from Fitzgerald, Armstrong etc. He told in an interview, "The sound was a little crazy but at the end of this tape, I remember it like yesterday, he starts his scat singing improvisation. I was thinking at the moment that this is a great idea. I say to his management to bring John Larkin from L.A. to my studio and in this moment, Scatman John was born!!!" In two days, working with producers Ingo Kays and Catania, the new single, "Scatman (Ski-Ba-Bop-Ba-Dop-Bop)" was created. Catania added, "Those days, the sounds were always the same, and I was coming up with an old jazz guy that had the talent to scat, something like that would shock the scene. I was right, Scatman John was a huge success worldwide." After the success of his first single, Larkin adopted the new name and persona of "Scatman" John.

Chart performance
The song was very successful on the charts all over the world, reaching number-one in Austria, Belgium, Denmark, Finland, France, Ireland, Norway, Spain, and Switzerland, as well as on the Eurochart Hot 100 and the Canadian RPM Dance/Urban chart. Additionally, it also reached the top 10 in Australia, Germany, the Netherlands, Scotland, Sweden and the UK. In the latter, the single reached number three in its third week at the UK Singles Chart, on May 21, 1995. It climbed into the top 20 in Iceland and Poland, and the top 40 in Japan and New Zealand. In the US, the single peaked at number 60 on the Billboard Hot 100, number ten on the Billboard Hot Dance Club Play chart and number 62 on the Cash Box Top 100. Scatman John was awarded the March 1996 Echo Award in Germany for the best Rock/Pop single with "Scatman". The single was also awarded with a gold record in Australia, Austria, Norway, Switzerland and the United Kingdom, and a platinum record in France and Germany.

Critical reception
Larry Flick from Billboard described "Scatman (Ski-Ba-Bop-Ba-Dop-Bop)" as a "novelty dance tune", noting that it "has a giddy Euro-NRG tone" and that Scatman John "bends his tongue to rapid, ear-popping effect." Dimitri Ehrlich from Entertainment Weekly wrote that "this synth-pop hit defines novelty: A chintzy drum machine pitter patters at a frantic pace while John, a Los Angeles jazz vocalist who has stuttered since childhood, frees himself from his speech impediment by scatting for three minutes and twenty seconds." In his weekly UK chart commentary, James Masterton viewed it as "a bizarre part-rapped, part spoken, part-scatted dance hit performed by the enigmatic Scatman John who is almost as old as my father and really should know better. Still, a culpable hit it is and destined apparently for the Top 3." Pan-European magazine Music & Media commented, "Try to say that title in one go without choking on your words. Impossible! But Scatman has no problems scatting his nonsensical rhyme, a serious candidate for a novelty dance hit." James Hamilton from Music Weeks RM Dance Update described it as "John Larkin's jaunty ragga scatted and 'I'm a Scatman' chanted Italian galloper". Debby Peterson from The Network Forty called it a "hellacious techno-dance groove".

Music video
The accompanying music video for "Scatman" was released in 1994 and directed by Kerstin Mueller. It was also produced by Ariola Records. It was shot in black and white, and features a fractured screen with several boxes showing shots of John singing, along with various people dancing, miming and playing drums. The video was played in heavy rotation on music channels in 1995. It was later published on Scatman John's official YouTube channel in November 2013. The video had generated more than 158 million views as of December 27th, 2022.

Sampling
In 2021, music producers Alan Walker and Imanbek sampled the song and additionally used wording from the title of the song in their hit "Sweet Dreams".

Accolades

Track listings

 12" single"Scatman" (Pech Remix) – 4:53
"Scatman" (Second Level Remix) – 5:41
"Scatman" (Arena Di Verona Mix) – 5:59
"Scatman" (Extended Radio Mix) – 5:06

 CD single "Scatman" (Basic Radio) – 3:30
 "Scatman" (Pech Remix) – 4:55
 "Scatman" (Arena Di Verona Mix) – 6:04
 "Scatman" (Third Level Mix) – 5:46

 CD maxi "Scatman" (Basic Radio) – 3:30
 "Scatman" (Jazz Level) – 3:41
 "Scatman" (Second Level) – 5:40
 "Scatman" (Third Level) – 5:46
 "Scatman" (Game Over Jazz) – 5:03

 CD maxi 2'
 "Scatman" (New Radio Edit) – 3:21
 "Scatman" (Pech Remix) – 4:55
 "Scatman" (Arena Di Verona Mix) – 6:04
 "Scatman" (Extended Radio Version) – 5:11

Charts and sales

Weekly charts

Year-end charts

Certifications

References

1994 debut singles
1995 singles
Scatman John songs
Number-one singles in Austria
Number-one singles in Denmark
Number-one singles in Finland
Number-one singles in Greece
Ultratop 50 Singles (Flanders) number-one singles
Ultratop 50 Singles (Wallonia) number-one singles
European Hot 100 Singles number-one singles
SNEP Top Singles number-one singles
Irish Singles Chart number-one singles
Number-one singles in Spain
Number-one singles in Norway
Number-one singles in Switzerland
Black-and-white music videos
Songs about diseases and disorders
RCA Records singles
1994 songs
Internet memes introduced in the 2000s